Jürgen Vogler (born 13 December 1925) was a German sailor. He competed in the Finn event at the 1956 Summer Olympics.

References

External links
 

1925 births
Possibly living people
German male sailors (sport)
Olympic sailors of the United Team of Germany
Sailors at the 1956 Summer Olympics – Finn
Sportspeople from Berlin